HBW Balingen-Weilstetten is a handball club from the city of Balingen, Germany, though they occasionally play in Stuttgart. The team currently plays in the 2. Handball-Bundesliga, Germany's second highest handball division.

History
The club was established from the merger in 2002 of the handball sections of TSG Balingen and TV Weilstetten. This merger was quickly beneficial as HBW Balingen-Weilstetten finished first in the regional championship (Regionalliga) and were promoted to 2. Handball-Bundesliga. HBW became champion in 2006, which meant promotion to the Handball-Bundesliga. The merger has been widely perceived to be successful since the club managed to maintain its position in the top division  that season thanks to its thirteenth place out of the 18 participants. The following seasons, the results of the club remained rather constant since it avoided relegation each season by ranking between thirteenth and fifteenth place (first non-relegation). At the end of the 2013/14 season, the team was ranked 16th in the table, so it was eliminated from the sports standings but remained in the Bundesliga because HSV Hamburg was not licensed for the 2014/15 season. The license was finally given to HSV Hamburg, so the 2014–2015 Bundesliga was played with 19 clubs. During the 2014/2015 season, the club achieved its best run in the Championship with an eleventh place but was relegated at the end of the 2016/2017 season due to its seventeenth place. Back in 2. Handball-Bundesliga, the club finished fifth in 2018 then champion in 2019, synonymous with a return to the top flight. HBW have remained in the Handball-Bundesliga since 2019 after a fifteenth-placed season in 2020–21.

Accomplishments
2. Handball-Bundesliga: 2
: 2006, 2019

Crest, colours, supporters

Kits

Team

Current squad
Squad for the 2021–22 season

Technical staff
 Head coach:  Jens Bürkle
 Assistant coach:  Matthias Flohr
 Athletic Trainer:  Sascha Ilitsch
 Physiotherapist:  Wolfgang Kremer-Junk
 Club doctor:  Dr. Wilfried Gfrörer

Transfers
Transfers for the 2022–23 season

Joining 

Leaving 
  Tim Nothdurft (LW) to  Bergischer HC
  Fabian Wiederstein (LP) to  SG BBM Bietigheim

Previous squads

EHF ranking

Former club members

Notable former players

  Florian Billek (2012–2014)
  Fabian Böhm (2013–2016)
  Matthias Flohr (2016–2019)
  Fabian Gutbrod (2011–2013)
  Kai Häfner (2011–2014)
  Pascal Hens (2016–2017)
  Benjamin Herth (2003–2013)
  Nikolas Katsigiannis (2012–2014)
  Stefan Kneer (2006–2008)
  Yves Kunkel (2015–2017)
  Jörg Kunze (2005–2007)
  Jürgen Müller (2003–2007)
  Philipp Müller (2008–2010)
  Christian Ramota (2008)
  Martin Strobel (2005–2008, 2013–2020)
  Christoph Theuerkauf (2012–2016)
  Martin Ziemer (2011–2012)
  Mare Hojc (2009–2011)
  Klemens Kainmüller (2006–2007)
  Romas Kirveliavičius (2018–2021)
  Nikola Marinovic (2009–2011)
  Roland Schlinger (2010–2014)
  Nikola Stevanovic (2021–2022)
  David Szlezak (2004–2005)
  Markus Wagesreiter (2008–2010)
  Tobias Wagner (2016–2018)
  Robert Weber (2008–2009)
  Faruk Vražalić (2014–2015)
  Viachaslau Saldatsenka (2017)
  Matej Ašanin (2014–2016)
  Kristian Bećiri (2021–)
  Vladimir Božić (2014–2016)
  Davor Dominiković (2015–2017)
  Mario Vuglač (2011–2012)
  Martin Kovář (2007)
  Tomáš Mrkva (2016–2019)
  Miloš Slabý (2004–2009)
  Mike Jensen (2019–2021)
  Simon Sejr (2021–)
  Morten Slundt (2012)
  Johan Boisedu (2010–2011)
  Rock Feliho (2007–2010)
  Olivier Nyokas (2014–2016)
  Yann Polydore (2014–2015)
  Ivan Zoubkoff (2003–2004, 2009–2011)
  Alexandros Alvanos (2011–2012)
  Spyros Balomenos (2008–2009)
  Alexandros Vasilakis (2014–2016)
  Nándor Fazekas (2015)
  Oddur Grétarsson (2017–)
  Daníel Þór Ingason (2021–)
  Sigtryggur Daði Rúnarsson (2017–2018)
  Cho Chi-hyo (2007–2009)
  Vlatko Mitkov (2010–2011)
  Filip Taleski (2019–2020)
  Vladimir Temelkov (2009–2011)
  Vladan Lipovina (2019–2022)
  Radivoje Ristanović (2014–2016)
  Gerrie Eijlers (2008–2009)
  Gleb Kalarash (2021)
  Milan Kosanović (2006–2008)
  Krsto Milošević (2012–2013)
  Aleksandar Stanojević (2006–2007)
  Dragan Tubić (2012–2015)
  Manuel Liniger (2012–2014)
  Miloš Putera (2012–2013)
  Peter Johannesson (2015–2017)
  Markus Stegefelt (2016–2018)
  Marouen Maggaiz (2017–2018)

Former coaches

References

External links

German handball clubs
Handball-Bundesliga
Handball clubs established in 2002
2002 establishments in Germany
Sport in Baden-Württemberg